Faruque Ahmed (born 24 July 1966), also known as Faruk Ahmed, is a former Bangladeshi cricketer who played in 7 ODIs from 1988 to 1999. A right hand middle order bat, he mostly batted at No. 3, but he could open the batting if necessary.

In ODIs
He made his ODI debut at Chittagong in 1988, against Pakistan
. His highest one day score was 57 against India at Chandigarh in 1990. There he put on 108 for the 3rd wicket with Athar Ali Khan.

In ICC Trophy
Ahmed also played in two ICC Trophy tournaments, in 1990 and 1994. He scored 56 against Canada in 1990. There he shared a match winning partnership of 121 with MOM Nurul Abedin (105). Overall, he scored 69 runs in 3 innings (Avg. 23.00). 4 years later, leading the side, he had a disappointing time with the bat in Kenya. He scored 114 runs at an average of 19.00.

As a captain
In the domestic circuit, Ahmed proved himself as a successful captain very early in his career. This prompted the national selectors to make him the Bangladesh captain for the 1993–94 season. This however, didn't turn out to be a very good decision. Specially, in the 1994 ICC Trophy in Kenya, dissatisfaction among senior players combined with injury to key players meant that Bangladesh failed to reach the Semis despite being one of the pre-tournament favorites.

After the 94 ICC Trophy, not only did Ahmed lose his captaincy, he also lost his place in the side. Nevertheless, he showed great courage to win back his place in the side as a top order batsman. He was one of the members of the Bangladesh side in the 1999 WC in England. He, however, failed to impress there, and retired afterward. After retirement, like many others of his generation, he has continued to serve Bangladesh cricket as an administrator. He has served as a national selector.

Outside cricket
Ahmed has a degree in Public Administration from the University of Dhaka.

References

External links

 Faruque bids his final bye (24 August 1999) | Cricket News | Bangladesh | ESPN Cricinfo

1966 births
Living people
Bangladesh One Day International cricketers
Bangladeshi cricketers
20th-century Bangladeshi cricketers
Biman Bangladesh Airlines cricketers
Cricketers at the 1998 Commonwealth Games
Cricketers at the 1999 Cricket World Cup
University of Dhaka alumni
Commonwealth Games competitors for Bangladesh
Cricketers from Dhaka